Shamari DeVoe ( Fears; born February 22, 1980) is an American singer. She is best known as the lead singer in the pop/R&B girl group Blaque. She also starred in the reality television series The Real Housewives of Atlanta.

Early life 
DeVoe was born on February 22, 1980, in Detroit, Michigan. She was raised in Atlanta, Georgia, and graduated from Georgia State University in 2013 with a bachelor of arts degree in Sociology.

Career 
She was discovered by American rapper Lisa Lopes, who mentored Blaque. She formed Blaque with Brandi Williams and Natina Reed. The group made their first appearance in 1997, in the music video for Lil' Kim's "Not Tonight". Their debut album Blaque (1999) sold more than 1.5 million copies and was certified Platinum. Billboard named Blaque as the fourth "Best New Artist" in 1999.

In 2000, DeVoe portrayed a cheerleader named Lava in the comedy film Bring It On.

Blaque went on hiatus until 2007 and eventually split in 2008. Natina Reed died after being hit by a car in 2012. DeVoe still performs with fellow group member Brandi Williams.

In November 2018, DeVoe joined the cast of the Bravo reality television series The Real Housewives of Atlanta for the show's eleventh season. On September 26, 2019, it was announced that DeVoe would not be returning for the twelfth season. She is working on a collaboration with her husband Ronnie DeVoe called Me & Mari. The duo released a single called "Love Comes Through" on December 7, 2018.

Personal life
On March 10, 2006, she married Ronnie DeVoe of New Edition and Bell Biv DeVoe. The couple have twin boys, Ronald and Roman born in 2017. DeVoe became a member of Alpha Kappa Alpha sorority in December 2014.

Discography

Album appearances

Filmography

Film

Television

Music video appearances

References

External links

1980 births
21st-century American singers
20th-century American singers
20th-century African-American women singers
Living people
American contemporary R&B singers
Blaque members
Singers from Detroit
20th-century American women singers
21st-century American women singers
21st-century African-American women singers